Crocidura guy is of species of shrew from Northeastern Vietnam, Viet Bac karst formation.

References

Crocidura
Mammals of Vietnam
Mammals described in 2009